Styphelia stomarrhena (common name - red swamp cranberry) is a small shrub species in the family Ericaceae. It is found in Western Australia.

Distribution and habitat 
It is found  in the IBRA regions of southern Geraldton Sandplains and northern Swan Coastal Plain bioregions, with some occurrences in the Avon Wheatbelt and Jarrah Forest bioregions, on deep sandy soils or sand on laterite,  in Banksia woodland or heathland communities.

Taxonomy 
The species was first described in 1845 as Astroloma stomarrhena by Otto Wihelm Sonder. In 1964 Hermann Otto Sleumer assigned it to the genus Styphelia. However, this change was not accepted until 2019 when phylogenetic studies by Darren Crayn, Michael Hislop and Caroline Puente-Lelièvre determined that Astroloma needed to be sunk into Styphelia. This resulted in the accepted description as Styphelia stomarrhena by Hislop and Puente-Lelièvre.

References 

stomarrhena

Flora of Western Australia
Plants described in 1845